The 1972 World Figure Skating Championships were held at the Stampede Corral in Calgary, Canada from March 7 to 11. At the event, sanctioned by the International Skating Union, medals were awarded in men's singles, ladies' singles, pair skating, and ice dance.

The ISU Representative was John R. Shoemaker (United States) and the ISU Technical Delegates were Hermann Schiechtl (West Germany) and Donald H. Gilchrist (Canada).

A day before the start of the competition, Irina Rodnina / Alexei Ulanov had an accident on a lift; she was hospitalized with a concussion and an intracranial hematoma but went on to compete and win the gold medal. It was Rodnina/Ulanov's final competition together; he would team up with the silver medalist, Lyudmila Smirnova.

Medal table

Results

Men

Referee:
 Donald H. Gilchrist 

Assistant Referee:
 Sonia Bianchetti 

Judges:
 Helga von Wiecki 
 Mollie Phillips 
 Dorothy Burkholder 
 William E. Lewis 
 Gerhardt Bubnik 
 Franz Heinlein 
 Masao Hasegawa 
 Monique Petis 
 Tatiana Danilenko 

Substitute judge:
 János Zsigmondy

Ladies

Referee:
 Josef Dědič 

Assistant Referee:
 Elemér Terták 

Judges:
 Ramona McIntyre 
 Suzanne Francis 
 Jeanine Donnier-Blanc 
 Giovanni DeMori 
 Walburga Grimm 
 Ludwig Gassner 
 Zoltán Balázs 
 René Schlageter 
 Wilhelm Kahle 

Substitute judge:
 Milan Duchón

Pairs

Referee:
 Karl Enderlin 

Assistant Referee:
 Hanry M. Beatty 

Judges:
 Pamela Davis 
 Walburga Grimm 
 Maria Zuchowicz 
 Elsbeth Bon 
 Inkeri Soininen 
 Suzanne Francis 
 János Zsigmondy 
 Ardelle K. Sanderson 
 Valentin Piseev 

Substitute judge:
 René Schlageter

Ice dance

Referee:
 Lawrence Demmy 

Assistant Referee:
 George J. Blundun 

Judges:
 Pamela Davis 
 Claude Lambert 
 Audrey Moore 
 Milan Duchón 
 Benjamin T. Wright 
 Eugen Romminger 
 Zoltán Balázs 
 Igor Kabanov 
 Maria Zuchowicz

References

Sources
 Result list provided by the ISU
 The Calgary Gerald (Calgary, Alberta, March 8, 9, 10, 11, 13, 1972)

World Figure Skating Championships
World Figure Skating Championships
World Figure Skating Championships
International figure skating competitions hosted by Canada
1972 in Canadian sports
1972 in Alberta
Sports competitions in Calgary
20th century in Calgary
March 1972 sports events in Canada